Joko Riyadi (born 30 June 1985) is an Indonesian badminton player affiliated with Jaya Raya Jakarta club.

Career 
Riyadi played men's doubles with Hendra Aprida Gunawan. They were bronze medalists at the 2005 Asian Badminton Championships, runners-up at the 2006 Dutch Open, and bronze medalists at the 2007 Southeast Asian Games. At the 2007 BWF World Championships they were seeded #14 and were defeated in the third round by Guo Zhendong and Xie Zhongbo, of China, 22–20, 16–21, 21–16. With new partner Luluk Hadiyanto he won the 2009 Vietnam Open.

Post-playing career 
After resigning from the national team and being an independent player for a while, Riyadi retired from international tournament and is now a member of the coaching staff of his former club Jaya Raya and coaching some independent players like Pia Zebadiah Bernadet, Rizki Amelia Pradipta, and Markis Kido.

Personal life 
When he was young, he joined the Jaya Raya Jakarta club. His parents' names are Joko Suseno (father) and Ari Wahyuni (mother). His hobby is football. Normally people call him Joko.

Achievements

Asian Championships 
Men's doubles

Southeast Asian Games 
Men's doubles

Asian Junior Championships 
Boys' doubles

BWF Grand Prix 
The BWF Grand Prix had two levels, the Grand Prix and Grand Prix Gold. It was a series of badminton tournaments sanctioned by the Badminton World Federation (BWF) and played between 2007 and 2017. The World Badminton Grand Prix was sanctioned by the International Badminton Federation from 1983 to 2006.

Men's doubles

  BWF Grand Prix Gold tournament
  BWF Grand Prix tournament

BWF International Challenge/Series/Satellite 
Men's doubles

  BWF International Challenge tournament
  BWF International Series & Asian Satellite tournament

Participation at Indonesian Team 
 1 time at Sudirman Cup (2007)
 1 time at Thomas Cup (2008)

External links 
 BWF Player Profile

1985 births
Living people
Sportspeople from Central Java
Indonesian male badminton players
Competitors at the 2007 Southeast Asian Games
Southeast Asian Games gold medalists for Indonesia
Southeast Asian Games bronze medalists for Indonesia
Southeast Asian Games medalists in badminton